The Aphidiinae are a subfamily of tiny parasitoid wasps that use aphids as their hosts. Several species have been used in biological control programs of various aphids.

Biology and distribution 
Aphidiines are koinobiont endoparasitoids of adult and immature aphids. While the larva of the 2–3 mm long Praon leaves the hollowed shell of the aphid from below to pupate in a volcano-like cocoon, most other Aphidiinae pupate inside the dead aphid and break out afterwards.

These wasps are found worldwide, but are primarily found in the northern hemisphere. Several species have been introduced to countries outside of their natural range, both accidentally and purposefully for biocontrol.

Systematics
Although they have often been treated as a separate family, the Aphidiidae, the Aphidiinae are a lineage within the Braconidae. It is not yet clear to which braconid subfamilies they are most closely related.

The Aphidiinae are subdivided into several tribes, the Ephedrini, Praini, Trioxini, Aclitini, and Aphidiini, with the latter subdivided into three subtribes. Most species reside in the Aphidiini. The Praini's loss of internal pupation is likely to be secondary.

There are ~400 spp. in ~50 genera worldwide.

Genera

Ephedrini
 Ephedrus
 Toxares

Praini
 Praon
 Dyscritulus
 Harkeria
 Areopraon

Trioxini
 Trioxys
 Binodoxys
 Monoctonus
 Monoctonia
 Lipolexis
 Parabioxys
 Bioxys

Aclitini
 Aclitus

Aphidiini
 Aphidius
 Diaeretiella
 Diaeretus
 Diaeretellus
 Lysaphidus
 Lysiphlebia
 Paralipsis
 Pauesia
 Protaphidius
 Pseudopauesia
 Adialytus
 Lysiphlebus
 Xenostigmus

See also
Aphidius nigripes

Footnotes

References
   (1997): A Molecular Phylogeny of the Aphidiinae (Hymenoptera: Braconidae). Molecular Phylogenetics and Evolution 7(3): 281-293. Abstract
  (2005): Molecular phylogeny of the Aphidiinae (Hymenoptera: Braconidae) based on DNA sequences of 16S rRNA, 18S rDNA and ATPase 6 genes. Eur. J. Entomol. 102: 133-138. PDF
   (2012): Aphidiinae (Braconidae: Hymenoptera) of Serbia and Montenegro – tritrophic interactions. Acta Entomologica Serbica 17(1/2): 83-105.

External links

 BugGuide.net: Information and Pictures of Aphidiinae
 Cedar Creek: Picture of a Praon sp.
brown citrus aphid parasitoid, Lipolexis scutellaris on the UF / IFAS Featured Creatures Web site

Braconidae
Hymenoptera subfamilies